The Aviatourist  was a long-range racing aircraft designed and built in the USSR, completed in 1936.

Development 
The Aviatourist was designed as a twin-engined, twin-seat long-range racing aircraft with a very similar layout to the de Havilland DH.88 Comet racer. With a structure mainly of Bakelite impregnated plywood (Delta-wood) the crew were housed in tandem cockpits and the engines in nacelles attached to the wings. The sole aircraft was completed in 1936 awaiting delivery of the de Havilland Gipsy Major engines, which failed to arrive causing the project to be abandoned.

Specifications (Aviatourist)

See also

References

 Gunston, Bill. “The Osprey Encyclopaedia of Russian Aircraft 1875–1995”. London, Osprey. 1995. 

1930s Soviet sport aircraft
OOS aircraft